Sir Brenton Halliburton (December 27, 1774 – July 16, 1860) was the eighth Chief Justice of the Supreme Court of Nova Scotia.

He was the son of John Halliburton.  He married the daughter of Bishop Charles Inglis,  Margaret Inglis, in 1799. He was named to the Nova Scotia Council in 1815, serving until judges were removed from the Council in 1837.  His portrait was done in 1849 by Albert Gallatin Hoit. Nova Scotian artist William Valentine painted Haliburton's portrait. He presided over the Libel trial of Joseph Howe, for which his son John C. Halliburton eventually challenged Joseph Howe to a duel in Point Pleasant Park. Halliburton was also a member of the North British Society. He also served in the Royal Nova Scotia Regiment. He supported the Royal Acadian School. He lived in the home he grew up in, the Bower, that still stands in Halifax.

Legacy 
 namesake of Brenton St. and Brenton Point, Halifax, Nova Scotia
 his wife is the namesake of Margaretsville, Nova Scotia

Gallery

References 
A History of Dalhousie Law School by John Wells. University of Toronto Press, 1979

1774 births
1860 deaths
Canadian Knights Bachelor
United Empire Loyalists
Colony of Nova Scotia judges